The Kherson Shipyard is a joint stock company located in Kherson, Ukraine at the mouth of the Dnieper River. The shipyard specializes in building merchant ships to include dry cargo ships, tankers, ice-breakers, container-ships, drilling vessels, and floating dry docks. In 1983, the shipyard delivered the impressive Alexei Kosygin class (named after Soviet Premier Alexei Kosygin) of Arctic barge carriers.

History

Soviet Ukraine 
The city of Kherson was founded in 1778 on a fortress place, which protected the lands of Russian Empire from Turkish raids. Kherson's proximity to the Black Sea initiated shipbuilding and people settlement in the estuary of the Dnieper river.

In 1953 first Soviet tanker ships Kherson and Grozny completed in this shipyard. A few years later, the production of dry cargo ships began. In 1965, one of the first ocean-going dry cargo gas turbines in the former Soviet Union, the Paris Commune, was built at the plant. In 1970, the main Soviet icebreaker and transport vessel, Captain Myshevsky was built at the shipyard.

Independent Ukraine 
During Ukraine's independence, Kherson Shipyard built about 25 different ships, including 13 tankers for shipowners in Norway, Denmark, Russia, two Arctic supply vessels for clients in South Africa and China, and four multi-purpose dry cargo ships for the Philippines and Norway.

In 2010, the plant was engaged in the construction of a series of anchor vessels for the Norwegian company Myklebust Prosjekt AS, as well as ship repair and production of river tankers for the Dutch company Veka Shipbuilding BV.

In autumn 2019, the company is carrying out preparatory work for the installation of equipment for thermal cutting of metal SAPPHIRE of the Polish company "ECKERT".

Facilities and Services 
The shipyard consists of two main production areas:

The hull assembling and metal processing facilities performs pre-processing of rolled metal to include straightening, shot-blasting, priming, cutting, and bending.  Specific capabilities include:

 Assembly and welding of flat sections sizing  x  and volumetric units up to 85–180 tons.  Production of sections and units facilitated by using 5 to 125 tons overhead cranes and semi- and fully automatic welding equipment.

Notable Vessels

See also 
 List of ships of Russia by project number
 List of Soviet and Russian submarine classes

References

External links 
 Madesta Developments Ltd. public website - processing/prefabrication of heavy plate
 Kherson Shipyard, JSC public website

Shipbuilding companies of Ukraine
Shipbuilding companies of the Soviet Union
Ukrainian brands